House at 326 North Peterboro Street is a historic home located at Canastota in Madison County, New York.  It was built about 1890 and is a large, -story frame residence in the Queen Anne style.  It features a sweeping verandah with paired Doric order columns and square cut balusters with a large conical roof at the corner.

It was added to the National Register of Historic Places in 1986.

References

Houses on the National Register of Historic Places in New York (state)
Queen Anne architecture in New York (state)
Houses completed in 1890
Houses in Madison County, New York
National Register of Historic Places in Madison County, New York